Thrissur Public Library is also known as Public Library of Thrissur. It was formed in 1872 in Thrissur city, Kerala, India.

History
The library was started by Diwan A Sankara Iyer in 1872. The library first started functioning at St. Mary's College, Thrissur library. Later it was shifted to the first floor of the Thrissur Town Hall in 1939. The library have 1,200 square feet space. It is the first computerised public library in Kerala in 1996.

References

Timeline of Thrissur

Libraries in Kerala
Culture of Thrissur
Public libraries in India
Buildings and structures in Thrissur
Education in Thrissur
1872 establishments in India
Libraries established in 1872